Luke Thomas may refer to:

Luke Thomas (chef) (born 1993), British chef
Luke Thomas (journalist) (born 1979), American mixed martial arts journalist, analyst, and radio host
Luke Thomas (footballer, born 2001), English football defender for Leicester City
Luke Thomas (footballer, born 1999), English football midfielder for Barnsley
Luke Thomas (rugby league), Wales international rugby league player
Luke Thomas, guitarist with The Pictures
Luke Thomas, Irish Dance award winner at 2003 Meteor Awards